K.I.S.S. (an abbreviation of Keep It Sexy & Simple) is the sixth studio album by American recording artist Mya. First released in Japan on April 20, 2011, it is her second studio album to be produced through Japanese record company Manhattan Recordings and her own label Planet 9. Although the record is a traditional R&B and pop album, Mya incorporated elements of multiple different genres after travelling to Jamaica as well as collaborating with Japanese musicians.

Production on K.I.S.S. was primarily handled by Cleveland native producer Young Yonny with additional contributions from Japanese musicians Jeff Miyahara and Daisuke Imai, Chuck Harmony and longtime collaborators Carvin & Ivan. As with her previous independent projects, Mya took full creative control of the album and lent a hand in the songwriting process, co-writing several of the album's tracks with many different artists and songwriters. In addition, she served as executive producer to the project. Guest features included Miami rapper Trina, international recording artist Iyaz, reggae star Sean Paul and former Immature frontman Marques Houston.

Upon its release, K.I.S.S. debuted at number sixty-one on Billboard Japan Albums Chart on May 2, 2011, with first week sales of 1,543 copies, and at number seventy-four on the US Top R&B/Hip-Hop Albums chart, ending Mya's nine-year absence from the chart. K.I.S.S. spawned seven singles; two international singles, "Fabulous Life" and "Runnin' Back" featuring recording artist Iyaz, and five US–released singles: "Earthquake", "Somebody Come Get This Bitch", "Mr. Incredible", "Mess Up My Hair", and "Evolve".

Background and development
In 2009, Mya released her first mixtape, Beauty & the Streets Vol. 1 on Planet 9 through J. Prince's Young Empire Music Group, and competed in the ninth season of American dance competition television series Dancing with the Stars. While participating on show, Mya began recording the album that would eventually become K.I.S.S. As with her previous album, she served as executive producer for K.I.S.S which entailed her scouting the producers, songwriters, arranging the album track listing, and keeping track of the accounting. While Sugar & Spice had been catered to Japan's distinct sound and market, Mya approached K.I.S.S. with the aim to record a "classic Mya album", balancing mid-tempos, up-tempos, slow jams and production, with "lots of substance to be discovered lyrically, without getting bored or depressed." Elaborating on the creative process in an interview with 4Eight Media, she commented that it "was a combination of including songs that I had in my archive for years in addition to travelling across the US and Jamaica to work with different producers and artists." The entire album, finished between October 2010 and February 2011, took her about five months to assemble and complete.

Conception and production

Primary production on K.I.S.S. was handled by hip hop producer Young Yonny with whom Mya had worked on her previous album Sugar & Spice (2008).  Additional contribution came from frequent collaborators Chuck Harmony, Carvin & Ivan, Rich Shelton, and Loren Hill, as well as Lee Major, Junior Sanchez, Lil' Eddie, Autumn Rowe, and Boyz II Men member Shawn Stockman. Japanese musicians who Mya consulted included Tokyo-based Jeff Miyahara and Daisuke Imai. Jamaican rapper Sean Paul, American singer Marques Houston, Virgin Islander singer Iyaz appeared on the original edition of the album, while Jamaican artists Spice and Beenie Man and American rapper Trina were included on subsequent editions of K.I.S.S.

Harrison, who recorded many of the songs during her stint on the ninth season of Dancing with the Stars, combined all different styles on the album. Incorporating a number of music genres, including dance, urban, pop, slow jam ballads, the singer described the album as a "classic Mya album" with a variety of sounds and tempos. When asked if she experimented with anything new on the album as far as sounds, she replied there are two J-pop-inspired songs on the album, "Fabulous Life" and "Alive". She further commented, "This is a new fun sound for me [...] and I'm ready to have some FUN!"

The overall concept of K.I.S.S. was simplicity. "It's about being cool and drama-free. And everything I do reflects that," Mya commented in a promotional interview. "The people that I associate with, the circle that I keep is real simple and sometimes we think or we're trained to believe that you always have to have more, more, more to make ourselves feel happy or beautiful, but it's the other way around for me." Mya noted that the deluxe edition was more of her traditional style, mixing "R&B, urban [and] also pop. It's fun, young with perspective and opinion," she said, with ballads like "Love Comes Love Goes" tackling "deeper issues". Harrison singled out "Evolve", a "heartfelt, mid-tempo" song as one of her favorites, commenting: "[It's] about having determination and will power through it all [...] and not letting anything stop you. It represents where I am in my life." Mya said the album's title track "K.I.S.S." is beneficial because it clarify the meaning of the album. "Love Me Some You" features Houston who Mya requested to record the song with her because she liked the tone of his voice; Harrison said the song was perfect for him. "Problem + Solution" was written by Afro-pop artist Tiwa Savage and Stockman. "Runnin' Back" was conceived as a flavored beat number with sweet mellow vocals. Another track, titled "Before U Say Goodbye" was described as "super catchy" with a "feeling of floating".

Release and promotion
The album cover of K.I.S.S. was shot by photographer Marc Baptiste and was primarily inspired by Janet Jackson's cover for 1986 album Control along with a few other artists, including Vanity 6, The Jets, Andy Warhol, and Lisa, Lisa. All singles cover artwork was shot by Reesee at Zigga Zagga studio. In an interview with AOL, Mya revealed that the meaning behind the abbreviation of K.I.S.S. stands for "Keep It Sexy and Simple." She further explained that she named her album K.I.S.S. because it is "sealed with a kiss as a gift to my fans. It's about keeping it simple by keeping negative energy and unnecessary things to a minimum. Being simple is sexy to me."

Originally scheduled for a physical release in Japan on April 6, 2011, the album's release was delayed for two weeks due to the unfortunate events surrounding the 2011 Tōhoku earthquake and tsunami disaster, which triggered the Fukushima I nuclear accidents, and temporarily immobilized packaging of the CD album. Despite these circumstances, K.I.S.S. eventually became available at retail and outlets on April 20, 2011, serving as Harrison's third independently-released project through her own label imprint Planet 9.

On July 22, 2011, Mya put on a special extended performance and held a listening party for the US release of K.I.S.S. in Atlantic City at the Chelsea Hotel's C5 Night Club. The North American deluxe edition of K.I.S.S. was released by Planet 9 on December 20, 2011 on software-based online digital media store iTunes. When the North American deluxe edition of K.I.S.S. was released, Mya opted not shoot any videos or do extensive promotion for the album. Commenting on this strategy, she explained that K.I.S.S. "is just a boutique album that I'm offering fans under the radar. If they want it, it's accessible now. This is just more of an appetizer. I've already started on what people will be looking forward to."

On February 1, 2012, Harrison announced in a press release that she would be releasing the worldwide edition of K.I.S.S. on February 14, 2012 to commemorate her debut single "It's All About Me" and fourteenth year in the music industry through her own label imprint Planet 9 with distribution from INgrooves, a veteran player in the digital music distribution and marketing space.

Critical reception 

K.I.S.S. received generally mixed reviews from critics. About.com editor Mark Edward Nero gave the album two out of five stars and declared it as "mediocre, unoriginal and creatively lacking material." He felt that "Mya tries out different personas like she's putting on new sets of clothes: she's a confident, independent woman on the title track; she's a sassy street chick on the club banger 'Earthquake'; she's a vulnerable, heartbroken girl on 'Love Comes, Love Goes'; and she's a strong, powerful woman on 'Evolve'," concluding that "she doesn't come off convincingly in any of the roles. And the lack of consistency and cohesiveness throughout the album ultimately proves to be the second-biggest drawback, right after the multiple weak vocal performances."

Staff writer Stephanie DeBalko of The Weekender gave the album three and a half stars out of five. She called K.I.S.S. "an unexpectedly vibrant, peppy outing", expressing that it "shows Mya still [has] a few tricks up her sleeve," while commenting the album's production and lyrical content, writing: "A lot of the songs have an '80s flavor to them, with jingly effects and forthright lyrics."

Commercial performance
Upon its original April 2011 release, K.I.S.S. debuted at number sixty-one on the Japanese Top Billboard Albums Chart and at number seventy-two on Japan's Oricon Albums Chart with first-week sales of 1,543. In its second week, K.I.S.S. dropped to number 97 on the Oricon Albums Chart and number 77 on Japan's Top Billboard Albums Chart, moving additional 1,422 units. K.I.S.S. continued to descend down the charts to number 118 on the Oricon Albums Chart and number 94 on Japan's Top Billboard Albums Chart, with additional 1,008 units. By its fourth week, K.I.S.S. had exited Japan's Top Billboard Albums Chart, however remained on Japan's Oricon Albums Chart, while falling to number 153 and moving another additional 625 units. In its fifth and final week, K.I.S.S. had fallen to number 188 on the Oricon Albums Chart, moving another additional 485 units. In the United States, K.I.S.S. debuted and peaked at number seventy-four on Billboards Top R&B/Hip-Hop Albums chart for the week of February 11, 2012. This marked Mya's first album chart entry in eight years as well as her lowest-charting effort to date. K.I.S.S. failed to debut on the Billboard 200 album chart or any other music market.

Track listing

Notes
  signifies a co-producer
  signifies an additional producer
  signifies a vocal producer

Sample credits
"Take Him Out" contains a sample of "Pon de Floor" by Major Lazer.
"Break Your Neck" contains a sample "It Takes Two" by Rob Base and DJ E-Z Rock

Personnel
Visuals and imagery

 Art direction and design – Motoki Mizoguchi
 Clothing design – André Adkins, Leon Frager
 Hair stylist – Yusef
 Make-up – Lisa Hayes
 Photography – Marc Baptiste
 Stylist – Leon Frager

Instruments

 Drums – Alex Selph
 Guitar – Daniel Groover
 Keyboard – Alex Selph
 Piano – Julian Brazer
 Strings – Jonathan Perkins

Technical and production

 Backing vocals – Caramel M. Faith, Tasha J. King, Lindsay Fields, Krystle Oliver, Atozzio Town
 Engineering – PJ Bianco, Mya Harrison, Loren Hill, Mike Johnson, Jared Newcomb, Rich Shelton, Young Yonny
 Mastering – Tucky@parasight
 Mixing – Ivan Barias, Brandon Bishop, Ben Chang, D.O.I., Carvin Haggins, John Ho, Satoshi Hosoi, Mike Johnson, Mike Mo, Frankie Mumbles, Nemhara, Young Yonny
 Recording – Jeff Miyahara

Charts

Release history

References

2011 albums
Mýa albums
Manhattan Records albums
Albums produced by the Inkredibles